The 1996 U.S. Figure Skating Championships took place between January 13 and 21, 1996 in San Jose, California. Skaters competed in five disciplines across three levels. The disciplines of the competition were men's singles, ladies' singles, pair skating, ice dancing, and compulsory figures. The levels of competition were Senior, Junior, and Novice. Medals were awarded in four colors: gold (first), silver (second), bronze (third), and pewter (fourth). In the figures event, the novice competitors skated one figure, and the juniors and seniors skated three.

The event served to help choose the U.S. team to the 1996 World Championships. The 1996 World Junior Championships had been held prior to the national championships and so the World Junior Championships team had been chosen at a World Juniors selection competition earlier in the year.

Senior results

Men

Ladies

Pairs

Ice dancing

Junior results

Men

Ladies

Pairs

Ice dancing

Novice results

Men

Ladies

Pairs

Ice dancing

External links
 1996 U.S. Championships

U.S. Figure Skating Championships
United States Figure Skating Championships, 1996
United States Figure Skating Championships, 1996
U.S. Figure Skating Championships